The XIII 2007 Pan Am Badminton Championships were held in Calgary, Alberta, Canada, between May 15 and May 19, 2007.

This event was part of the 2007 BWF Grand Prix Gold and Grand Prix series of the Badminton World Federation.

Venue
Calgary Winter Club

Medalists

External links
Official website
TournamentSoftware.com: Results

Pan Am Badminton Championships
Pan Am Badminton Championships
Pan Am Badminton Championships
Badminton tournaments in Canada
Sport in Calgary